The Second Battle of Agordat was fought in late December 1893, between Italian colonial troops and Mahdists from the Sudan. Emir Ahmed Ali campaigned against the Italian forces in eastern Sudan and led about 10–12,000 men east from Kassala. This force encountered 2,400 Italians and their Eritrean askaris at Agordat, west of Asmara, commanded by Colonel Arimondi. Over 1,000 Dervishes, including the Emir, were killed in severe fighting. The outcome of the battle constituted:

A year later, Italian colonial forces seized Kassala.

Sources

1893 in Sudan
1893 in the Italian Empire
Agordat
Agordat
Agordat
Agordat
December 1893 events
Italian Eritrea

fr:Combat d'Agordat